William P. Leahy  (born 1948) is the 25th President of Boston College, a post he has held since 1996, making him the longest serving president in the school's history as of July 31, 2020. He was born in Omaha, Nebraska and raised in Imogene, Iowa. He joined the Society of Jesus in 1967, and is a member of the Jesuits' Midwest Province. Leahy earned a bachelor's degree in philosophy and a master's degree in United States history at Saint Louis University in 1972 and 1975, respectively. He then began studies at the Jesuit School of Theology at Berkeley in Berkeley, California, where he earned degrees in theology (1978) and historical theology (1980). He was ordained a priest in 1978. He received a doctoral degree in U.S. history from Stanford University in 1986.

He began his academic career as a teacher at Campion High School in Wisconsin from 1973 to 1975. He served as a teaching assistant at Stanford in 1981 before joining the Marquette University faculty as an instructor of history in 1985. He became an associate professor with tenure in 1991, and in that same year became Marquette's executive vice president.

Leahy's memberships include the American Catholic Historical Association, the American Historical Association, the History of Education Society, and the Organization of American Historians.

Boston College presidency

Achievements
Since becoming Boston College president, Leahy has accelerated the growth and development of the university initiated by his predecessor J. Donald Monan. Boston College's endowment has continued to increase rapidly to more than $2 billion, making BC one of the 50 wealthiest universities in the nation. During the years after the global recession of 2008, Leahy's effective fiscal governance has enabled BC to emerge in a position of strength. BC had the fastest-growing endowment of many high-ranking universities. During Leahy's presidency, the campus has expanded by almost 150 acres (607,000 m²), and undergraduate applications have surpassed 30,000. At the same time, its students, faculty and athletic teams have seen unprecedented success — winning record numbers of Truman, Marshall, Fulbright, Rhodes scholarships as well as other academic awards and research grants.

In 2006, after a two-year self-study involving more than 200 BC faculty, administrators, students and alumni, Leahy announced a $1.6-billion strategic plan that called for hiring 100 new faculty, adding a dozen new academic centers and spending $1 billion in construction and renovation projects to elevate Boston College to the highest echelon of premier national universities. The Plan set seven strategic directions for the University:  To become a national leader in liberal arts education and student formation; to enhance its research initiatives in select natural sciences and in areas that address urgent social problems; to support leadership initiatives in BC's graduate and professional schools; to expand international programs and partnerships. Leahy's stated goal was to establish Boston College as "the world's leading Catholic university."

In line with this direction, the Weston Jesuit School of Theology re-affiliated with Boston College in 2008 to form the new School of Theology and Ministry. During the same year, Leahy started the construction of Stokes Hall, a  administrative and classroom building for BC's humanities departments, which opened in 2012. Already in 2002, Leahy initiated the Church in the 21st Century program to examine issues facing the Roman Catholic Church in light of the clergy sexual abuse scandal.

In athletics, Boston College won conference and national titles during Leahy's presidency: for example four national men's ice hockey championships. In 2005, it left the Big East Conference and joined the Atlantic Coast Conference.

Published works

Books
Adapting to America: Catholics, Jesuits and Higher Education in the Twentieth Century (Georgetown University Press, 1991)

Articles
Leahy has written a number of articles on Catholic higher education in the United States, including, among others:
"The Rise of Laity in American Catholic Higher Education," Records of the American Catholic Historical Society (1991)
"Academic Professionalism and American Catholic Higher Education," Assembly 1989: Jesuit Ministry in Higher Education (1990)
In addition, Leahy has authored numerous articles in the Dictionary of Christianity in America and book reviews in History, Journal of American History and History of Education Quarterly.

Notes

References 
 

1948 births
American education writers
20th-century American Jesuits
21st-century American Jesuits
Presidents of Boston College
Schoolteachers from Nebraska
American historians
Living people
People from Fremont County, Iowa
Writers from Omaha, Nebraska
Saint Louis University alumni
Stanford University alumni
Catholics from Iowa